Michael Jackson: The Life of an Icon is a documentary film about pop singer Michael Jackson produced by his friend, David Gest. The film features footage of the beginning of The Jackson 5, Jackson's solo career and the child molestation accusations made against him. It also has interviews with Jackson's mother, Katherine, and siblings, Tito and Rebbie Jackson, as well as other artists—who were inspired by him and had met him before his death—including Whitney Houston, Smokey Robinson and Dionne Warwick. The film was released on DVD and Blu-ray on November 2, 2011.

Cast

 Michael Jackson (archive footage)
 Katherine Jackson
 Tito Jackson
 Rebbie Jackson
 David Gest
 Quincy Jones
 Dionne Warwick
 Whitney Houston
 Thomas Mesereau
 Frank Cascio
 Percy Sledge
 Petula Clark
 Paul Anka
 Dennis Edwards
 Jimmy Ruffin
 Freda Payne
 Brian Holland
 Lamont Dozier
 Eddie Holland
 Martha Reeves
 Nick Ashford
 Valerie Simpson
 Abdul Fakir
 Ron Alexenberg
 Peabo Bryson
 Eddie Floyd
 Marilyn McCoo
 Billy Davis, Jr.
 Kim Weston
 Brenda Holloway
 Don Black
 Ronnie Rancifer
 Bobby Taylor
 Keith Jackson
 Ronald Jackson
 Reynaud Jones
 Frank DiLeo
 J. Randy Taraborrelli
 Milford Hite
 Robert Hite
 Dexter Wansel
 Russell Thompkins, Jr.
 Mickey Rooney
 Weldon A. McDougal III
 Mark Lester
 Kenny Gamble
 Leon Huff
 Billy Paul

References

External links
 
 
 

Documentary films about Michael Jackson
American documentary films
Universal Pictures films
2010s English-language films
2010s American films